In horse racing in the United Kingdom, France and Republic of Ireland, National Hunt racing requires horses to jump fences and ditches. National Hunt racing in the UK is informally known as "jumps" and is divided into two major distinct branches:  hurdles and steeplechases. Alongside these there are "bumpers", which are National Hunt flat races. In a hurdles race, the horses jump over obstacles called hurdles; in a steeplechase the horses jump over a variety of obstacles that can include plain fences,  water jump or an open ditch. In the UK, the biggest National Hunt events of the year are generally considered to be the Grand National and the Cheltenham Gold Cup.

Outline
Most of the National Hunt season takes place in the winter when the softer ground makes jumping less dangerous. The horses are much cheaper, as the majority are geldings and have no breeding value. This makes the sport more popular as the horses are not usually retired at such a young age and thus become familiar to the racing public over a number of seasons.

Jump racing is most popular in Britain, Ireland and France. In Ireland the sport receives much higher attendances than flat racing, while in England, Wales and Scotland it is more balanced, but the different seasons (there is little top-class flat racing in Britain from November to March) mean that most fans of the sport can enjoy both forms of racing.

National Hunt horses are often bred for jumping, while others are former flat horses. National Hunt horses do not have to be Thoroughbreds: many French-bred jumpers are Selle Français or AQPS.

The two main highlights of the National Hunt calendar are the Cheltenham Festival meeting and the Grand National meeting. The Cheltenham Festival is held at Cheltenham Racecourse over four days in the second week of March. It features eleven grade one races, culminating in the Cheltenham Gold Cup, the best and most prestigious Chase race in the world, on the Friday. The Grand National meeting is held at Aintree over three days every April. Many of the best horses come to these festivals, which are watched by a huge television audience worldwide. Hundreds of millions of pounds are gambled on these festivals.

Other important festivals are: the Galway Races – a hugely popular mixed (NH and flat) meeting in Ireland; Punchestown Festival – the Irish equivalent of the Cheltenham Festival; The Tingle Creek at Sandown Park Racecourse; the Scottish Grand National at Ayr Racecourse; the King George VI Chase at Kempton Park Racecourse; the Welsh National at Chepstow Racecourse; and the Irish National at Fairyhouse Racecourse.

History 
National Hunt racing originated in Ireland, particularly in the southern counties. Early races were mainly two-horse contests known as "pounding races" that became popular in the early 18th century.  These involved long trips across country where horses were required to jump whatever obstacles the landscape threw in their way. 

The first recorded race of this nature is traditionally said to have taken place between the towns of Buttevant and Doneraile in the north of County Cork in 1752. The start and finish were marked by the church steeple in each town, hence the term "steeplechase". Point-to-point races, amateur steeplechases normally run on farmland, remain hugely popular in the same region and in many parts of rural Ireland and Great Britain, today.

The first use of the term steeplechase on an official racecard was in Ireland in the early 19th century. The 'official' first running of the Grand National, held annually at Aintree in England, took place in 1839 and was won by an Irish horse, Lottery. Notably, the 'Liverpool Grand Steeplechase' (to give its original name) was actually initiated in 1836, although the three earliest runnings have been overlooked in many historical chronicles.

Organised steeplechasing in Britain began with annual events being staged cross country over a number of fields, hedges and brooks, the earliest most notable of these being the St Albans Steeplechase (first run in 1830).  For some years, there was no regulation of steeplechasing. The sport gained a reputation as being a bastard relation of flat-racing and consequently fell into decline.

A breakthrough came in the 1860s with the formation of the National Hunt Committee, and the running of the National Hunt Steeplechase.  This steeplechase would form part of an annual race-meeting staged at a different track each year.  The 'National Hunt Meeting' established itself in the racing calendar, in turn moving around such courses as Sandown, Newmarket, Derby, Liverpool, Hurst Park, Lincoln, Leicester and many others.

In 1904 and 1905, Cheltenham hosted the meeting, and although Warwick was awarded it for five years after that, it then returned to Cheltenham which became the permanent home of the fixture.  Further prestigious races were added to the card during the 1920s, such as the Cheltenham Gold Cup and Champion Hurdle.

As steeplechasing entered its modern era, the Cheltenham Festival became the pinnacle of the season, providing a series of championship races at which virtually all top horses would be targeted.

With the introduction of sponsorship (starting with the Whitbread Gold Cup in 1957), a whole host of other important races have been added to the National Hunt racing season, although many of these are geared towards generating betting turnover in the form of competitive handicaps that attract large numbers of runners.

National Hunt racing today 
Given the sport's origins, Irish-bred and trained horses remain a dominant force in national hunt racing today. In 2005 and 2006, Irish-trained horses captured the three main prizes at Cheltenham and won the Grand National. Best Mate who captured the Cheltenham Gold Cup three successive times between 2002–2004, was Irish-bred, but trained and owned in England. 

In recent years however French-bred horses have also come to the forefront with horses such as Master Minded becoming the highest rated horse in Britain after winning the Queen Mother Champion Chase. Kauto Star who won the Gold Cup in 2007, 2009 and was second in 2008 is also French bred.

Types of race
Chase – 
Hurdling – 
National Hunt Flat race (NH Flat) –
are flat races for horses that have not yet competed either in flat racing or over obstacles, often called 'bumper' races.

Grades and classes
Races are graded. The most prestigious are Grade 1, then Grade 2, Grade 3, Listed, Handicaps, to Bumpers the least prestigious. The more highly graded races attract more prize money and better horses.
(In flat racing the more prestigious races are Group 1, 2, and 3, then Listed)

All National Hunt races are also classified in classes 1-7 (class 1 best). Graded and listed races are class 1.

See the list of Grade 1-3 National Hunt races and the list of Group 1-3 Flat races

Major National Hunt festivals

Cheltenham

The capital of National Hunt racing in the UK is Cheltenham Racecourse, in the Cotswolds, which hosts the Cheltenham Festival in the third week of March each year, as well as other important fixtures during the NH calendar.

There are numerous well-known trainers operating in the Cotswolds including Jonjo O'Neill, Richard Phillips, Tom George, Nigel Twiston-Davies, and latterly Kim Bailey. 

The highlight of the Cheltenham Festival is the Gold Cup. All races run at Cheltenham finish with a long uphill run-in in front of the stands. All horses carry the same weight in the Gold Cup. On numerous occasions the hill at the finish has found out the brave. Famous winners of the Gold Cup include Dawn Run (mare, ridden by Jonjo O'Neill), Arkle, Golden Miller, Best Mate, Desert Orchid & Kauto Star.

Grand National
The highest profile National Hunt race is the Grand National, run at Aintree in April each year. Perhaps the most fundamental difference is that the Grand National fences are far bigger than the fences at Cheltenham, and a number of fences incorporate significant drops.

Winners of the Grand National include Red Rum (won 3 times:1973, 1974, 1977), runner up twice (1975, 1976)); Mr Frisk (1990, the last winner to date to be ridden by an amateur jockey and still holds the record for the fastest time); Aldaniti (1981, ridden by Bob Champion shortly after he had recovered from cancer. His story was made into a film);  and Foinavon (1967, won at odds of 100/1 after a mêlée at the 23rd fence resulted in the majority of the field falling or refusing. Foinavon was far enough behind at that point to avoid the confusion and ran on to win by 20 lengths. The fence where the mêlée occurred is now named "Foinavon Fence").

Other National Hunt races

Other NH races of note include the King George VI Chase, run at Kempton Park on 26 December and the Hennessy Gold Cup run at Newbury at the end of November.

Hunter chase racing
Hunter chases take place at national hunt racecourses, but are only open to horses that have hunter certificates. Hunter certificates are issued to horses that have hunted for at least four days in the season before racing starts in January. In addition, the jockey must be an amateur who has obtained a certificate from the hunt secretary. 

Unlike point-to-points, licensed trainers as well as amateur trainers may have runners in Hunter Chases.  This often causes controversy when big name trainers run former Grade 1 horses in Hunter Chases as amateur trainers feel they are unable to compete. New rules which took effect in 2009 will prevent horses which have finished in the first 3 of a Grade 1 or 2 chase in the previous season from taking part.

The two biggest Hunter Chases are the Aintree Fox Hunters' Chase and Cheltenham Foxhunter Chase. The Aintree Fox Hunters' is run as the feature race on the first day of the Grand National meeting over one circuit of the Grand National course. This gives amateur riders the chance to jump these famous fences before the professionals.

The Cheltenham Foxhunter is run after the Gold Cup over the same distance and is often referred to as the amateur Gold Cup.

Point to point racing

"Point to Point" racing is steeplechase racing for amateurs.

See also 
Steeplechase for this style of horse racing more generically ('steeplechase' being the term used for similar styles of racing in the USA)

References

External links
 Follow the National Hunt Festival '08 with BBC Gloucestershire
 BBC Gloucestershire's Virtual Cheltenham: An insider's view of the world famous National Hunt course
 British Horseracing Authority - Guide to National Hunt racing
 National Hunt Chase. The race at the foundation of National Hunt Racing.

Horse racing terminology
Horse racing in Great Britain
Steeplechase (horse racing)
Hunt racing